Ian Scott may refer to:
Sir Ian Dixon Scott (1909–2002), British civil servant and diplomat
Ian Scott (cyclist) (1915–1980), British silver medal winner at the 1948 Summer Olympics
Ian Scott (Rotarian) (1933–2001), founder of Australian Rotary Health, non-government funder of medical research
Ian Scott (Ontario politician) (1934–2006), politician in the Canadian province of Ontario
Ian Scott (Australian footballer) (born 1940), Australian rules footballer
Ian Scott (artist) (1945–2013), New Zealand artist
Ian Scott (footballer, born 1967), English footballer
Ian Scott (actor) (born 1973), French pornographic actor
Ian Scott (American football) (born 1981), American football player
Ian Scott (producer) (born 1975), American record producer
Ian Scott (Manitoba politician), Green Party of Canada election candidate in 2004
Ian James Scott (1914–2010), British painter
Ian Scott (Canadian businessman), Canadian telecom executive
Ian Scott, co-founder of Moltex, developers of the Stable Salt Reactor
Ian Scott (ice hockey) (born 1999), Canadian ice hockey goaltender

See also
Scott Ian (born 1963), guitarist of Anthrax